The T Brigade Group was a formation of the Royal Netherlands Army. At the end of the Second World War the formation consisted of the 2nd Battalion, 6th RIR, 1st Stootroepen Battalion and the 2/13th Light Infantry Battalion. The brigade group relieved the British 5th Parachute Brigade in Java on 26 April 1946.

Notes

References

1946 in Indonesia
Brigades of the Netherlands